Gongzhufen Station is an interchange station on Line 1 and Line 10 of the Beijing Subway.

Station Layout 
Both the line 1 and 10 stations have underground island platforms.

Exits 
The station originally had eight exits. When line 10 started serving the station, the original exits were closed. There are currently four exits, lettered A, B, C, and D. Exits A and D are accessible.

Gallery

References 

Beijing Subway stations in Haidian District
Railway stations in China opened in 1971